Holzamer is a surname. Notable people with the surname include: 

Karl Holzamer (1906–2007), German philosopher
Wilhelm Holzamer (1870–1907), German novelist

See also
Holzemer